Chariessa is a genus of checkered beetles in the family Cleridae. Chariessa beetles are carnivorous and often associated with trees of the genus Quercus, likely due to a preference for lignicolous insects that live in oaks.

References

External links 
 
 Chariessa at bugguide.net

Cleridae genera